Stolpe (Norwegian: habitational name from the farm name Stolpe(n) mostly from stolpe "pole post" referring to a high and narrow mountain or hill) may refer to:

Places
Stolpe auf Usedom, a municipality in the district Ostvorpommern, Mecklenburg-Vorpommern, Germany
Stolpe (Berlin), an ancient village in Wannsee, Berlin, Germany 
Stolpe, Ostvorpommern, a municipality in the district Ostvorpommern, Mecklenburg-Vorpommern, Germany
Stolpe, Parchim, a municipality in the district of Parchim, Mecklenburg-Vorpommern, Germany
Stolpe, Schleswig-Holstein, a municipality in the district of Plön, Schleswig-Holstein, Germany
Stolpe, an archaic version of Stolp, the German name of Słupsk in Poland
Słupia, a river in Poland

People with the surname
Daniel Owen Stolpe (1939–2018), American printmaker
Gustav Stolpe (1833–1902), Swedish composer
Hjalmar Stolpe (1841–1905), Swedish entomologist, archaeologist, and ethnographer
Manfred Stolpe (1936–2019), German politician
Sven Stolpe (1905–1996), Swedish writer
Johan Linderstolpe, Swedish doctor for whom the genera Lindera is named

Surnames of German origin

Surnames of Swedish origin